Chyandour Brook is a small river (brook) in west Cornwall, England. Rising in Boskednan in the civil parish of Madron, Chyandour Brook drains into Mount's Bay in the English Channel at Chyandour, Penzance.

Course 
Located entirely in the west of Cornwall, Chyandour Brook rises in the Penwith Moors in Boskednan, civil parish of Madron, and flows a southeasterly course. After flowing past the village of Madron, Chyandour Brook turns east through Heamoor, in the civil parish of Penzance. It then flows through Treneere—a residential council estate—before resuming a southeasterly course into Chyandour, where it drains into Mount's Bay in the English Channel.

Flooding 
Chyandour Brook has overflown on several occasions, with many significant flooding incidents between 2002 and 2014. The Environment Agency, a non-departmental public body sponsored by the United Kingdom's Department for Environment, Food and Rural Affairs, declares most of the surrounding area of Chyandour Brook in Flood zone 3, indicating a "high probability of flooding."

References

Sources 

Rivers of Cornwall